Euchrysops albistriata, the Capronnier's Cupid, is a butterfly in the family Lycaenidae. It is found in Guinea, Sierra Leone, Liberia, Ivory Coast, Ghana, Nigeria, Cameroon, the Democratic Republic of the Congo, Sudan, Uganda, Ethiopia, Kenya, Tanzania and Zambia. The habitat consists of forests, Guinea savanna, Sudan savanna and disturbed areas in the forest zone.

Subspecies
Euchrysops albistriata albistriata (Cameroon, Democratic Republic of the Congo, southern Sudan, Uganda, Ethiopia, Kenya, Tanzania, Zambia)
Euchrysops albistriata greenwoodi d'Abrera, 1980 (Guinea, Sierra Leone, Liberia, Ivory Coast, Ghana, Nigeria)

References

External links
Die Gross-Schmetterlinge der Erde 13: Die Afrikanischen Tagfalter. Plate XIII 65 k

Butterflies described in 1889
Euchrysops
Butterflies of Africa